The 3rd New Jersey Cavalry Regiment was a cavalry regiment that served in the Union Army during the American Civil War. The "Butterflies", as they were known, were famous for being one of only two Union regiments designated as hussars, and the only one to serve with the Army of the Potomac.

Equipment

The Butterflies were issued with a unique Austrian inspired uniform comprising a navy blue dolman with yellow chest braid, a peakless forage cap, and a short hooded cloak with red lining. Officers wore pelisses over their uniforms, and busbies were used for ceremonial occasions. In addition to being armed with a sabre and a pair of Remington New Model Army revolvers, each trooper was issued with a repeating Spencer carbine.

Service
The 3rd New Jersey Cavalry Regiment was organized at Camp Bayard in Trenton, New Jersey and mustered in beginning December 2, 1863 under the command of Colonel Andrew J. Morrison.

The regiment was attached to Cavalry, IX Corps, Army of the Potomac, to May 1864. 1st Brigade, 3rd Division, Cavalry Corps, Army of the Potomac and Middle Military Division, to June 1865. Defenses of Washington, D.C., to August 1865.

The 3rd New Jersey Cavalry mustered out August 1, 1865 at Washington, D.C.

Detailed service
March to Annapolis, Md., April 5–7, 1864. Guard Orange & Alexandria Railroad April 29-May 5. Campaign from the Rapidan to the James May 3-June 12, 1864. Wilderness May 5–7. Near Germanin Ford May 5. Picket on the Rapidan May 6. Guard pontoons May 7. Expedition to Fredericksburg May 8–9. Spotsylvania May 9–12. Spotsylvania Court House May 12–21. United States Ford May 19. North Anna River May 23–26. On line of the Pamunkey May 26–28. Totopotomoy May 28–31. Mechump's Creek May 31. Ashland Station June 1. Cold Harbor June 1–12. Totopotomoy, Gaines' Mill, Salem Church and Haw's Shop June 2. Haw's Shop June 3. Bethesda Church June 11. White Oak Swamp June 13. Smith's Store, near St. Mary's Church, June 15. Weldon Railroad June 20. Jerusalem Plank Road June 22–23. Milford Station June 27. Picket duty at City Point until July 16. Duty at Light House Point July 16–25. Before Petersburg July 25. Mine Explosion, Petersburg, July 30 (Companies A and E). Sheridan's Shenandoah Valley Campaign August 7-November 28. Winchester August 17. Summit Point August 21. Middleway August 21. Near Kearneysville August 25. Abraham's Creek, near Winchester, September 13. Battle of Winchester September 19. Near Cedarville September 20. Front Royal September 21. Milford September 22. Waynesboro September 29. Bridgewater October 2. Tom's Brook ("Woodstock Races") October 8–9. Picket at Cedar Creek until October 13. Cedar Creek October 13. Battle of Cedar Creek October 19. Newtown (or Middletown) November 12. Rude's Hill, near Mr. Jackson, November 22. Expedition from Kernstown to Lacey's Springs December 19–22. Lacey's Springs December 21. Sheridan's Raid from Winchester February 27-March 24, 1865. Occupation of Staunton March 2. Action at Waynesboro March 2. Occupation of Charlottesville March 3. Near Ashland March 15. Appomattox Campaign March 28-April 9. Dinwiddie Court House March 30–31. Five Forks April 1. Fall of Petersburg April 2. Namozine Church April 3. Sailor's Creek April 6. Appomattox Station April 8. Appomattox Court House April 9. Surrender of Lee and his army. Expedition to Danville and South Boston April 23–27. March to Washington. D.C., May. Grand Review of the Armies May 23.

Casualties
The regiment lost a total of 157 men during service; 3 officers and 47 enlisted men killed or mortally wounded, 2 officers and 105 enlisted men died of disease.

Commanders
 Colonel Andrew J. Morrison - resigned August 29, 1863
 Colonel Alexander Cummings McWhorter Pennington Jr.

See also

 List of New Jersey Civil War units
 New Jersey in the American Civil War
 Black Horse Troop, a hussar regiment in the Southern Army of Northern Virginia

References

 Dyer, Frederick H. A Compendium of the War of the Rebellion (Des Moines, IA: Dyer Pub. Co.), 1908.
 Lubrecht, Peter T. New Jersey Butterfly Boys in the Civil War: The Hussars of the Union Army (Charleston, SC: History Press), 2011.  
Attribution
 

Military units and formations established in 1863
Military units and formations disestablished in 1865
Units and formations of the Union Army from New Jersey